Fixed prayer times, praying at dedicated times during the day, are common practice in major world religions such as Judaism, Christianity, and Islam.

Judaism 

Jewish law requires Jews to pray thrice a day; the morning prayer is known as Shacharit, the afternoon prayer is known as Mincha, and the evening prayer is known as Maariv. According to Jewish tradition, the prophet Abraham introduced Shacharit, the prophet Isaac introduced Mincha, and the prophet Jacob introduced Maariv. Jews historically prayed in the direction of the Temple of Solomon in Jerusalem, where the "presence of the transcendent God (shekinah) [resided] in the Holy of Holies of the Temple". In the Bible, it is written that when the prophet Daniel was in Babylon, he "went to his house where he had windows in his upper chamber open to Jerusalem; and he got down upon his knees three times a day and prayed and gave thanks before his God, as he had done previously" (cf. ). After its destruction, Jews continue to pray facing Jerusalem in hope for the coming of the Messiah whom they await.

Christianity 

From the time of the early Church, the practice of seven fixed prayer times have been taught. In Apostolic Tradition, Hippolytus instructed Christians to pray seven times a day, "on rising, at the lighting of the evening lamp, at bedtime, at midnight" and "the third, sixth and ninth hours of the day, being hours associated with Christ's Passion." Christians attended two liturgies on the Lord's Day, worshipping communally in both a morning service and evening service, with the purpose of reading the Scriptures and celebrating the Eucharist. Throughout the rest of the week, Christians assembled at the church every day for morning prayer (which became known as lauds) and evening prayer (which became known as vespers), while praying at the other fixed prayer times privately; Christian monastics came to gather together to corporately pray all of the canonical hours communally. This practice of seven fixed prayer times was done in the bodily positions of prostration and standing, which continues today in some Christian denominations, especially those of Oriental Christianity.

In the Indian Christian and Syriac Christian tradition, these canonical hours are known as Vespers (Ramsho [6 pm]), Compline (Soutoro [9 pm]), Nocturns (Lilio [12 am]), Matins (Sapro [6 am]), third hour prayer (Tloth sho`in [9 am]), sixth hour prayer (Sheth sho`in [12 pm]), and ninth hour prayer (Tsha' sho`in [3 pm]). In the Coptic Christian and Ethiopian Christian tradition, these seven canonical hours are known as the First Hour (Prime [6 am]), the Third Hour (Terce [9 am]), the Sixth Hour (Sext [12 pm]), the Ninth Hour (None [3 pm]), the Eleventh Hour (Vespers [6 pm]), the Twelfth Hour (Compline [9 pm]), and the Midnight office [12 am]; monastics pray an additional hour known as the Veil. Church bells are tolled at these hours to enjoin the faithful to Christian prayer. Those who are unable to pray the canonical hour of a certain fixed prayer time may recite the Qauma, in the Indian Orthodox tradition. 

In Western Christianity and Eastern Orthodox Christianity, the practice of praying the canonical hours at fixed prayer times became mainly observed by monastics and clergy, though today, the Catholic Church encourages the laity to pray the Liturgy of the Hours and in the Lutheran Churches and Anglican Communion, breviaries such as The Brotherhood Prayer Book and  the Anglican Breviary, respectively, are used to pray the Daily Office; the Methodist tradition has emphasized the praying of the canonical hours as an "essential practice" in being a disciple of Jesus, with the Order of Saint Luke, a Methodist religious order, printing The Book of Offices and Services to serve this end.

Many Christians have historically hung a Christian cross the eastern wall of their houses, which they face during these seven fixed prayer times. Before praying, Oriental Orthodox Christians and Oriental Protestant Christians wash their hands, face and feet in order to be clean before and present their best to God; shoes are removed in order to acknowledge that one is offering prayer before a holy God. In these Christian denominations, and in many others as well, it is customary for women to wear a Christian headcovering when praying.

Mandaeism

Daily prayer in Mandaeism called brakha consists of a set prayers that are recited three times per day. Mandaeans stand facing north while reciting daily prayers. Unlike in Islam and Coptic Orthodox Christianity, prostration is not practiced.

Mandaean priests recite rahma prayers three times every day, while laypeople also recite the Rushma (signing prayer) and Asiet Malkia ("Healing of Kings") daily.

The three prayer times in Mandaeism are:

dawn (sunrise) 
noontime (the "seventh hour") 
evening (sunset)

Islam 

Muslims pray five times a day, with their prayers being known as Fajr (dawn), Dhuhr (after midday), Asr (afternoon), Maghrib (sunset), Isha (nighttime), facing towards Mecca. The direction of prayer is called the qibla; the early Muslims initially prayed in the direction of Jerusalem before this was changed to Mecca in 624 CE, about a year after Muhammad's migration to Medina.

The timing of the five prayers are fixed intervals defined by daily astronomical phenomena. For example, the Maghrib prayer can be performed at any time after sunset and before the disappearance of the red twilight from the west. In a mosque, the muezzin broadcasts the call to prayer at the beginning of each interval. Because the start and end times for prayers are related to the solar diurnal motion, they vary throughout the year and depend on the local latitude and longitude when expressed in local time. In modern times, various religious or scientific agencies in Muslim countries produce annual prayer timetables for each locality, and electronic clocks capable of calculating local prayer times have been created. In the past, some mosques employed astronomers called the muwaqqits who were responsible for regulating the prayer time using mathematical astronomy.

Baháʼí Faith 

Followers of the Baháʼí Faith must choose either a short, medium, or long prayer each day to fulfill the requirement of the daily obligatory prayer. Reciting these prayers is considered one of the Baháʼí's most important obligations. The short prayer can only be said between noon and sunset, while the medium prayer must be said three times during the day: once between sunrise and noon, once between noon and sunset, and once in the two hours following sunset.  The long prayer is not bound by a fixed prayer time. The text of these prayers is taken from the writings of the religion's founder, Baháʼu'lláh.

Sikhism 
Initiated Sikhs are obligated to perform five daily prayers at varying times during the day, from the collection of Nitnem prayers. In the morning, typically right after waking and bathing, the Japji Sahib, Jaap Sahib, and Tav Prasad Savaiye prayers are recited. In the evening, the Sodar Rahras Sahib is recited, and before bed the Kirtan Sohila is recited.

See also 

Ad orientem
Awgatha
Breviary
Buddhist devotion
Cetiya
Cantharus
Cross necklace 
Direction of prayer
Daily devotional
Mealtime Prayer
Home altar
Hygiene in Christianity
Jingxiang
Prayer book

Notes

References

Further reading

External links 
Shehimo - Indian Orthodox Christian prayer times
Agpeya - Coptic Christian prayer times
Salah - Islamic prayer times
Islamic prayer times calculator worldwide

Jewish practices
Christian prayer
Salah
Time in religion